Lloyd E. Varden (November 6, 1911 - January 15, 1970) was an expert in the photographic field and related sciences.  He was an adjunct Professor of Photographic Sciences and Engineering at Columbia University in New York 1951-1968.



Personal 
Varden was born on November 6, 1911 in Evansville, Indiana.  He grew up there attending Bosse High School.  He studied chemistry at Maryville College and the University of Kentucky but was forced to drop out and enter the workforce due to the lack of family finances in the Great Depression.  He married Madeline Rose Maulding of Evansville, Indiana in 1935.  Divorced, he then married Maude Belling in 1953.  Varden died in 1970 in New York City.

Career in Industry 
Varden first joined Huffman Labs in Evansville as a chemist.  Following his interest in chemistry and photography, he joined Agfa Ansco as a technical representative in 1934 in Cincinnati.   In 1936 he was brought to Ansco Division of General Aniline and Film Corporation in Binghamton, New York, where he rose to Director of Education.  Taking a hiatus during the Second World War, he served on the War Production Board in Washington D.C.   After the war, he returned to Ansco for a short period.   In 1945 he joined Pavelle Color Labs in New York City and was there until 1955 as Vice President and Technical Director.

International Consultant 
In 1955 Varden went on his own as a consultant in the industry and became an adjunct Professor at Columbia University School of Engineering.   His U.S. clients included 3M, Polaroid, Xerox and Brookhaven National Labs.   His international clients included Ferrania (Italy), Ciba (Switzerland), Perutz (Germany), Agfa (Germany), Gevaert (Belgium), Ilford (UK) and Fuji Photo Film (Japan.)

The Varden Library 
At the time of his death, he had amassed the second largest Photographic Sciences library in the world.  It was the largest private library of its type with Eastman Kodak’s being the biggest. Varden educated himself with the books, collecting and adding other libraries over the years. After his death, his library was sold to Fuji Photo Film and is still there today.

Publication 
Varden wrote numerous parts of major books on Photographic Sciences.  During the sixties, he wrote a monthly article called “What’s Ahead” in Modern Photography magazine.

Honors 
Varden received an honorary Degree from Maryville College in 1964.  He won the Breme Memorial Medal in 1952 from Rochester Institute of Technology; The Louis Schmid Award 1957 from The Biological Photographers Association, and the Photographic Society of America Progress Medal 1964   He was a Fellow of the Society of Photographic Scientists and Engineers and a Fellow of the Royal Photographic Society of Great Britain.

References 
 “Owner of Large Library Gives Some Tips on Ways to Keep Up in the Field” Jacob Deschin; New York Times Sunday February 10, 1952
 “Focus on Columbia’s Varden” Cora Wright; Popular Photography.  December 1961,  P70,99,100-103
 Lloyd Varden Awarded Honorary Doctor of Science; Society of Photographic Scientists and Engineers (SPSE- NY Bulletin) vol. II, No.6, May 15, 1964
 Maryville College Commencement 145th Year Wednesday, June 3, 1964  
New York Times January 16, 1970; Obituaries
 “In Memorandum Professor Lloyd E Varden 1911-1970”; Image Dynamics in Science and Medicine 1970 Vol 1 P4 
 “Historic Photo Collections on the move: Where are they now?” Jacob Deschin; Popular Photography; November 1975, p102

1911 births
1970 deaths
People from Evansville, Indiana
Maryville College alumni
University of Kentucky alumni
Columbia University faculty
Fellows of the Royal Photographic Society